The Sicilian wall lizard (Podarcis waglerianus) is a species of lizard in the family Lacertidae. Endemic to Italy, it occurs in Sicily and the Aegadian Islands. Its natural habitats are temperate forests, temperate shrubland, Mediterranean-type shrubby vegetation, temperate grassland, arable land, pastureland, and rural gardens. The IUCN does not consider it to be a threatened species. Three subspecies are recognized: P. w. antoninoi, P. w. marettimensis, and P. w. waglerianus.

Etymology
The specific name, waglerianus, is in honor of German herpetologist Johann Georg Wagler.

Description
The dorsal surface is usually green, but some females may be olive or brownish. Usually, it has a well-defined white or yellow dorsolateral stripe and often a brown stripe, or series of dots,  running along the spine. Other dark spots occur in rows on the back and flanks of males, but females are often a more uniform colour. The underparts are white, with a spotted throat, but may be suffused with orange, pink, or red in breeding males. The Sicilian wall lizard differs from island populations of the Italian wall lizard in having a deeper head, more slender form, more speckled (rather than reticulated) markings, and the brighter colour of the underparts.

Distribution and habitat
The species is endemic to Sicily and the Aegadian Islands. It frequents areas with lush vegetation on the edges of woodland, bushy slopes, pasture, and cultivated land. It is often present in gardens, especially irrigated ones. In contrast to the Italian wall lizard, it does not climb much and occupies more densely vegetated areas. It is the more common wall lizard inland, while the Italian wall lizard is the more common near the coast.

Biology
The female lays a clutch of four to six oval eggs, usually concealed at the base of a plant.

Status
P. waglerianus is widespread in Sicily, is tolerant of a range of habitats, and is assumed to have a large total population. Its populations are in general stable, though it may be declining in number on some islands. The International Union for Conservation of Nature has assessed it as being of "least concern".

See also
List of reptiles of Italy

References

Further reading
Böhme W, Köhler (2005). "Do Endings of Adjective Flectible Species Names Affect Stability? A Final Note on the Gender of Podarcis Wagler, 1830 (Reptilia, Laceridae)". Bonner zoologischen Beiträge 53 (3/4): 291–293. (Podarcis waglerianus, gender changed from feminine to masculine).
Gistel J (1868). "Die Lurche Europas. Ein Beitrage zur Lehre von der geographischen Verbreitung derselben ". pp. 144–167. In: Gistel J (1868). Blicke in das Leben der Natur und des Menschen. Ein Taschenbuch zur Verbreitung gemeinnütziger Kenntnisse insebesondere des Natur-, Länder- und Völkerkunde, Künste und Gewerbe. Leipzig: Wartig. 274 pp. (Podarcis wagleriana, new species, p. 149). (in German).
Sindaco R, Jeremčenko VK (2008). The Reptiles of the Western Palearctic. 1. Annotated Checklist and Distributional Atlas of the Turtles, Crocodiles, Amphisbaenians and Lizards of Europe, North Africa, Middle East and Central Asia. (Monographs of the Societas Herpetologica Italica). Latina, Italy: Edizioni Belvedere. 580 pp. . (Podarcis waglerianus).
Taddei A (1949). "Le lacerte (Archaeolacerta e Podarcis) dell'Italia peninsulare e delle isole ". Commentationes Pontificia Academia Scientarum 13 (4): 197–274. (Lacerta wagleriana, new combination, p. 202). (in Italian, with an abstract in Latin).

External links

Podarcis
Reptiles described in 1868
Taxa named by Johannes von Nepomuk Franz Xaver Gistel
Lizards of Europe
Endemic fauna of Italy
Taxonomy articles created by Polbot